Tom Brown Jr. (born January 29, 1950) is an American naturalist, tracker, survivalist, and author from New Jersey, where he runs the Tom Brown Jr. Tracker School.

In his books, Brown claims that, from the age of seven, he and his childhood friend Rick were trained in tracking and wilderness survival by Rick's grandfather, "Stalking Wolf" (whom Brown claims was Lipan Apache). There is no evidence that "Stalking Wolf" ever existed. Brown writes that Stalking Wolf died when Brown was 17, and that Rick was killed in an accident in Europe shortly thereafter.

Brown spent the next ten years working odd jobs to support his wilderness adventures. He then set out to find other people in New Jersey who were interested in his experiences. Initially Brown met with little success, but was eventually called on to help locate a crime suspect. Though the case won him national attention, he was subsequently sued for 5 million dollars for finding the wrong person. Despite this failure, he was able to build on this exposure to develop a profession as a full-time tracker, advertising his services for locating lost persons, dangerous animals, and fugitives from the law. According to People magazine, "He stalks men and animals, mostly in New Jersey."

The Tracker School
Tom Brown Jr.'s Tracker School is located in New Jersey. Most classes offered by Tracker School are held in "Primitive Camp", which is located in the Pine Barrens of New Jersey. However, classes are also offered in California. Workshops involve Brown's versions of Plains Indian ceremonies, including the sweat lodge and vision quest.

Personal life
In July 1977 Tom Brown Jr. married Judy Duck Ford, 33. At the time Judy had a daughter Kerry, 15, and a son Paul, 11, from a previous marriage. The two had one child, Tom Brown III, together. Brown later married Debbie Brown and had two children with her, Coty Tracker Brown and River Scout Brown.  Brown is currently married to his third wife, Celeste Brown.

Publications and media
Brown has written 18 books to date. His first book The Tracker, in 1978, chronicled his coming of age. Reader's Digest printed a condensed version of the story and provided information about Brown's new Tracker School.  Tom Brown's books are published by Penguin Books:
 The Tracker (1978, 1986), 
 The Search (1980, 2001), 
 Field Guide to Living With the Earth (1984), 
 Guide to Wild Edible and Medicinal Plants (1986), 
 Guide to City and Suburban Survival (1986), 
 Field Guide to Living with the Earth (1986), 
 Field Guide to Nature Observation and Tracking (1986), 
 Field Guide to the Forgotten Wilderness (1987), 
 Field Guide to Wilderness Survival (1987), 
 The Vision (1988), 
 Field Guide to Nature and Survival for Children (1989), 
 The Quest (1991), 
 The Journey (1992), 
 Grandfather (1993, 2001), audio book (2007)
 Awakening Spirits (1994), 
 The Way of the Scout (1995), 
 The Science and Art of Tracking (1999), 
 Case Files of the Tracker (2003), 
 Guide to Healing the Earth (2019), 

The Mother Earth News website provides these articles by Tom Brown Jr.:
 Issue 71, Sep-Oct 1981:  Wilderness Shelter 
 Issue 72, Nov-Dec 1981:  Finding Water 
 Issue 73, Jan-Feb 1982:  Fire Starting 
 Issue 74, Mar-Apr 1982:  Hunting & Traps 
 Issue 75, May-Jun 1982:  Edible Plants 
 Issue 76, Jul-Aug 1982:  Survival Cooking 
 Issue 77, Sep-Oct 1982:  Animal Tracking 
 Issue 79, Jan-Feb 1983:  Natural Cordage 
 Issue 87, May-Jun 1984:  Bow Making 
 Issue 93, May-Jun 1985:  Survival Skills 
 Issue 95, Sep-Oct 1985:  Advanced Shelters 

  CBS News reports:   24 June 2005    6 December 2006

See also
Ernest Thompson Seton

References

External links
 A 6-Day Experience at Tom Brown Jr.'s Tracker School
 The Tracker Trail
 The Tracker School

1950 births
American naturalists
Living people
People from Toms River, New Jersey
Pine Barrens (New Jersey)
Wilderness
Survivalists